Blowing is the third studio album by Japanese band Tokio. It was released on March 25, 1996. The album reached seventh place on the Oricon weekly chart and charted for six weeks.

Track listing

Personnel 

 Shigeru Joshima - guitar
 Tomoya Nagase - lead vocalist, guitar
 Masahiro Matsuoka - drums
 Taichi Kokubun - keyboard
 Tatsuya Yamaguchi - bass

References 

1996 albums
Tokio (band) albums